Dennis John Harte (1866 in New York City – February 19, 1917 in Long Island City, Queens, New York City) was an American politician from New York.

Life
He worked for a wholesale importing company.

Harte was a member of the New York State Assembly (Queens Co., 1st D.) in 1906.

He was a member of the New York State Senate (2nd D.) from 1907 to 1912, sitting in the 130th, 131st, 132nd, 133rd, 134th and 135th New York State Legislatures.

He died on February 19, 1917, at his home at 350 Stevens Street in Long Island City.

Sources
 Official New York from Cleveland to Hughes by Charles Elliott Fitch (Hurd Publishing Co., New York and Buffalo, 1911, Vol. IV; pg. 352 and 366f)
 Ex-State Senator Dennis J. Harte in NYT on February 21, 1917

1866 births
1917 deaths
Democratic Party New York (state) state senators
People from Queens, New York
Democratic Party members of the New York State Assembly
19th-century American politicians